Sean Brock is an American chef specializing in Southern cuisine.

Early life and education
Brock is originally from Pound in rural southwest Virginia. His father, who owned a trucking fleet that hauled coal, died when Brock was 11, resulting in the family becoming impoverished. He started working on the line at age 16. Brock graduated from culinary school at Johnson & Wales University in 2000.

Restaurants
He has been the executive chef at Charleston, South Carolina's Husk since its opening in 2010, as well as a partner at McCrady's Restaurant. The menu at Husk uses authentically Southern ingredients and also food grown in Brock's own garden. He is noted for preserving Southern foodways and heirloom ingredients, and collaborates with David Shields, the McClintock Professor of Southern Letters at University of South Carolina. A second Husk location opened in Nashville in 2013.

In 2015 Brock opened Minero at Ponce City Market, Atlanta, Georgia. In November 2017, Brock opened the third Husk location in Greenville, South Carolina, in the city's West End district.  In January 2018, Brock opened the fourth Husk location in Savannah, Georgia, in a restored building in the city’s landmark historic district.

He maintained the title of "founding chef and culinary advisor" at all four Husk locations until May 2019. In spring of 2020 he plans to open a two-story, two-restaurant eatery in East Nashville, Tennessee centered around Appalachian cuisine. The two restaurants are named Audrey, for his grandmother, and Red Bird.

Awards
In 2010, he won the James Beard Foundation Award for Best Chef Southeast. He has also been nominated for Outstanding Chef and Rising Star Chef.

Bon Appétit Magazine named Husk the “Best New Restaurant in America” in 2011.

Brock's first cookbook, Heritage, was released in October 2014 and is a New York Times bestseller. His Heritage cookbook also won the James Beard Foundation's award in the American Cooking category in April 2015.
His second cookbook, South: Essential Recipes and New Explorations, was released in 2019 and featured in The New Yorker's best cookbooks of 2019.

Television
Brock was one of the hosts of the second season of The Mind of a Chef. For his work on the show, Brock was nominated for a Daytime Emmy Award in the Outstanding Culinary Host category. He was also a featured chef in the sixth season of Netflix's Chef's Table.

Personal life
He was previously married to high school sweetheart, Tonya Combs, marrying in 2006. In 2014 they divorced.

In 2016, after undergoing testing and various surgeries for three years, he was diagnosed with myasthenia gravis at Mayo Clinic.  His friends became concerned about his drinking, and he spent his 39th birthday in rehab.

In February 2019, he and his girlfriend, Adi Noe, eloped. The couple have a son and a daughter.

References

Living people
American male chefs
Chefs from Virginia
American television chefs
University of South Carolina faculty
Johnson & Wales University alumni
People from Pound, Virginia
James Beard Foundation Award winners
American cookbook writers
21st-century American male writers
21st-century American non-fiction writers
American male non-fiction writers
Writers from Virginia
1978 births
Chefs from Tennessee